Liudmila Malofeeva (born 18 May 1988) is a retired Russian female volleyball player. She was part of the Russia women's national volleyball team.

She participated in the 2010 FIVB Volleyball Women's World Championship. She played with Omichka Omsk.

Clubs
  Omichka Omsk (2010)

References

1988 births
Living people
Russian women's volleyball players
Place of birth missing (living people)
20th-century Russian women
21st-century Russian women